Norcantharidin is a synthetic anticancer compound.

References

Carboxylic anhydrides